Brezje pri Slovenski Bistrici is a small settlement in the Municipality of Slovenska Bistrica in northeastern Slovenia. The area is part of the traditional region of Styria. It is now included with the rest of the municipality in the Drava Statistical Region.

Name
The name of the settlement was changed from Brezje to Brezje pri Slovenski Bistrici in 1953.

References

External links
Brezje pri Slovenski Bistrici at Geopedia

Populated places in the Municipality of Slovenska Bistrica